Push  may refer to:

Music
 Mike Dierickx (born 1973), a Belgian producer also known as Push

Albums
 Push (Bros album), 1988
 Push (Gruntruck album), 1992
 Push (Jacky Terrasson album), 2010

Songs
 "Push" (Enrique Iglesias song), 2008
 "Push" (Avril Lavigne song), 2011
 "Push" (Lenny Kravitz song), 2011
 "Push" (Matchbox Twenty song), 1997
 "Push" (Moist song), 1994
 "Push" (Pharoahe Monch song), 2006
 "Push", by Tisha Campbell and Vanilla Ice on Campbell's 1993 album Tisha
 "Push", by The Cure on the 1985 album The Head on the Door
 "Push", by Dio on the 2002 album Killing the Dragon
 "Push", by Nick Jonas on the 2014 album Nick Jonas
 "Push", by Madonna on the 2005 album Confessions on a Dance Floor
 "Push", by Marianas Trench on the 2006 album Fix Me
 "Push", by Sarah McLachlan on the 2003 album Afterglow
 "Push", by Dannii Minogue on the 2003 album Neon Nights
 "Push", by Prince on the 1991 album Diamonds and Pearls
 "Push", by Smash Mouth on the 1997 album Fush Yu Mang
 "Push", by Helloween on the 1998 album Better Than Raw

Film and television
 Push (American TV series), a short-lived ABC 1998 TV series
 Push (Canadian TV series), a 2023 Canadian documentary series
 Push, Nevada, a mystery television series starring Derek Cecil
 Push (2006 film), starring Chad Lindberg
 Push (2009 film), a thriller starring Chris Evans and Dakota Fanning
 Precious (film), a 2009 drama film previously titled Push and Push: Based on a Novel by Sapphire

Technology
 Push email, a type of e-mail system
 Push processing, a photographic technique
 Push technology, a method of content delivery
 A command used to add an entity to a stack
 PSH (or PUSH), a flag in the Transmission Control Protocol
 PuSH, shorthand for PubSubHubbub, former name for WebSub

Other
 Push (novel), a 1996 novel by Sapphire
 Push (professional wrestling)
 PUSH (university guide), a British media organisation
 Push the Talking Trash Can, a Disney theme park robot
 Push, Iran, a village in Ardabil Province, Iran
 Rainbow/PUSH, a social justice organization
 A tie in the game of blackjack
 Two meanings in contract bridge
 A term in sports betting
 Push approach in management, see push–pull strategy

See also
 Push Push (disambiguation)